George Raymond Barton (born 6 September 1977 in Tamworth, New South Wales) is an Australian sport shooter. He won a bronze medal in men's skeet pair shooting, along with his brother Clive Barton, at the 2006 Commonwealth Games in Melbourne, with a total score of 183 points.

Barton made his official debut for the 2004 Summer Olympics in Athens, where he placed twenty-ninth in men's skeet shooting, with a total score of 118 points, tying his position with Egypt's Mostafa Hamdy.

At the 2008 Summer Olympics in Beijing, Barton competed for the second time, as a 30-year-old, in men's skeet shooting, along with his teammate Paul Rahman. He finished only in seventeenth place by one point behind Czech Republic's Jan Sychra, for a total score of 116 targets.

References

External links
Profile – Australian Olympic Team
NBC Olympics Profile

Australian male sport shooters
Skeet shooters
Living people
Olympic shooters of Australia
Shooters at the 2004 Summer Olympics
Shooters at the 2008 Summer Olympics
Shooters at the 2006 Commonwealth Games
Commonwealth Games bronze medallists for Australia
People from Tamworth, New South Wales
1977 births
Commonwealth Games medallists in shooting
Sportsmen from New South Wales
21st-century Australian people
Medallists at the 2006 Commonwealth Games